Island Records Australia is an Australian record label that was launched in 2007 by Michael Taylor (now serving as managing director, Universal Music Australia). It is part of the Universal Music Group and is the Australian variant of Island Records. Island Records Australia is headed by Michael Taylor. Nicole Richards is General Manager.

Vanderbilt describes "Island Australia (as) a home for artists who cut their own path, who start from the left, and who, in time, come into the mainstream on their own artistic terms".

Island Records Australia is the label home for established artists Dean Lewis, Tame Impala, Matt Corby, Broods, Hilltop Hoods, Havana Brown, and Vera Blue, along with emerging artists Baker Boy, Eliott, Cap Carter, Winterbourne, Running Touch and Peach PRC.

In 2020, Island Records Australia had the #1 streaming Australian artist with Hilltop Hoods, won 5x ARIAs including Album of the Year with Tame Impala, and hit 5 billion streams with Dean Lewis' debut album, A Place We Knew. In March 2020, during the COVID-19 lockdown, Island Records Australia launched their Live From The Island livestreaming series where a number of artists on the roster performed their music live online for fans, and hosted trivia nights and live painting sessions.

Songwriting Invitationals 
Island Records Australia is a co-sponsor of The Invitational Group's 'Bali Songwriting Invitational', and 'Tuscany Songwriting Invitational' – 10-day song-writing events for artists, songwriters and producers held in private villas in Ubud, Bali and Camporgiano, Italy. Attendees at past events include; Nick Jonas, Kesha, Demi Lovato, Noah Cyrus, Oak Felder, Steve Lillywhite, Cathy Dennis, Taylor Parx, and Brian Lee. Other co-sponsors include APRA AMCOS and Milk & Honey Music Management.

Current artists

 Adrian Eagle
 Alice Skye (via Bad Apples Music)
 AViVA
 Aydan
 Baker Boy
 Barkaa (via Bad Apples Music)
 Birdz (via Bad Apples Music)
 Briggs
 Broods
 Cap Carter
 Charlie Collins
 Clare Bowditch
 Coterie
 Dean Lewis
 Eliott
 Havana Brown
 Hilltop Hoods
 Isabella Manfredi
 iyah may
 Jarryd James
 Kobie Dee (via Bad Apples Music)
 Karise Eden
 Lakyn
 Los Leo
 Matt Corby
 Nooky (via Bad Apples Music)
 Peach PRC
 Polish Club
 Ruby Boots
 Running Touch
 Seth Sentry
 Shane Nicholson (via Lost Highway Records)
 Tame Impala
 The Mcclymonts
 The Million
 The Naked and Famous
 The Preatures
 THE RIOT
 Thundamentals
 Tigerlily
 Tori Forsyth
 trials
 Vera Blue
 Washington
 Winterbourne
 Yorke
 Zekiel

Former artists

See also

List of record labels

References

External links
Official website, Island Records Australia
Instagram
 Facebook
 Twitter

Universal Music Group
Australian record labels
Australian subsidiaries of foreign companies
Record labels based in Sydney